Carpobrotus rossii is a succulent coastal groundcover plant native to southern Australia.  It is known by various common names, including karkalla, pig face, sea fig and beach bananas.

C.rossii can be confused with rounded noon-flower Disphyma crassifolium subsp. clavellatum, which has also been erroneously called "karkalla" and "beach bananas" in the Australian native food trade.

Description

Distribution
The species occurs in the states of Western Australia, South Australia, Tasmania and Victoria. 
It can be found year-round in large patches covering sand dunes close to the ocean, due to its hardy nature and salt resistance.

Uses
Aboriginal people eat the fruit traditionally, fresh and dried. The salty leaves were also reported to have been eaten with meat. The salty edible leaves should not be confused with rounded noon-flower, which also has edible leaves and is marketed as "karkalla".

Extracts of the plant have significant in vitro antioxidant, antiplatelet, and anti-inflammatory activity.

References

rossii
Bushfood
Caryophyllales of Australia
Flora of South Australia
Flora of Victoria (Australia)
Flora of Tasmania
Eudicots of Western Australia
Groundcovers